James Michael Coonan (born December 21, 1946), nicknamed "Jimmy C", is an Irish-American mobster and racketeer from Manhattan, New York who, from approximately 1977 to 1988, served as the boss of the Westies gang, an Irish mob group based in Hell's Kitchen. Coonan was incarcerated and began serving a 75-year prison term in 1988.

Biography

James Coonan was born on December 21, 1946 into a middle class Irish-American family in the Hell's Kitchen area of Manhattan, the second of four children of John Coonan, an accountant who ran a tax office on West 50th Street, and his wife Anna, who was of partial German descent and who worked at John Coonan's office. He was raised in a five-room walk-up apartment on West 49th Street. By his teenage years, Coonan stood five feet, seven inches tall and had a stocky build, with broad shoulders and a thick neck. An amateur boxer and street fighter, he dropped out of school aged seventeen and embarked on a career in organized crime. When Coonan was a young man, his father John was kidnapped, pistol-whipped and severely beaten by Mickey Spillane, a well-known mobster who frequently employed the kidnap-for-ransom racket of local merchants to their families. Author T.J. English has credited this event in several books as Coonan's motivating factor in the takeover of the Westies.

Coonan was the bodyguard/apprentice of loan shark Charles (Ruby) Stein according to The New York Times article that alleged he was "known and feared on the West Side as a murderer and kidnapper". Coonan wanted more, and several West Side neighborhood thugs gathered around him, including Francis "Mickey" Featherstone. By 1976, Coonan and Featherstone were engaged in taking over Spillane's territory, culminating in the 1977 shooting of Spillane, for which Featherstone was arrested and acquitted, and the death of Stein. According to testimony given in 1987 by ex-Westies member turned informant William Beattie, Stein was killed and beheaded in 1977 in a move to erase Coonan's debt and prove the Westies power through viciousness.

In 1979, Coonan was tried and acquitted for the murder of Harold Whitehead, but convicted on weapons charges and sentenced to four years in federal prison.  After his release he resumed power, but in 1988 was convicted of racketeering under the Racketeer Influenced and Corrupt Organizations Act (RICO) and sentenced to 75 years in prison with the judge's recommendation of denying parole. Coonan was first eligible for parole in 1998.

He and his wife Edna (b.1942; Julia Edna Crotty) lived in Hazlet and Keansburg, New Jersey, before his incarceration.

Notes

Bibliography

References

External links
Inmate Locator - James Coonan  Federal Bureau of Prisons website
James and Edna Coonan's 1989 appeal brief

1946 births
Living people
20th-century American criminals
American male criminals
American gangsters of Irish descent
American gangsters of German descent
American crime bosses
American people convicted of murder
People convicted of racketeering
People from Hazlet, New Jersey
People from Hell's Kitchen, Manhattan
People from Keansburg, New Jersey
People convicted of murder by the United States federal government
Prisoners and detainees of the United States federal government
Criminals from Manhattan
Gangsters from New York City
Gambino crime family
Westies (New York gang)